Sośno  is a village in Sępólno County, Kuyavian-Pomeranian Voivodeship, in north-central Poland. It is the seat of the gmina (administrative district) called Gmina Sośno.

The village has a population of 980.

References

Villages in Sępólno County
Pomeranian Voivodeship (1919–1939)